Bonagota arizonae is a species of moth of the family Tortricidae. It is found in the United States in Arizona where it was found in the Huachuca Mountains.

References

Moths described in 2000
Euliini
Moths of North America
Taxa named by Józef Razowski